Freddy Van Gaever (19 June 1938 – 15 December 2017) was a Belgian politician and a member of the Vlaams Belang. He was elected as a member of the Flemish Parliament in 2004 and served until 2007, when he was coopted to the Belgian Senate (2007–2010).

In his earlier career he was a manager in road haulage and at Delta Air Transport; and in 1984 he created Frevag Airlines.
In 1992 he founded VLM Airlines, which he soon sold, and in 2002 VG Airlines, which soon folded.

References

1938 births
2017 deaths
Vlaams Belang politicians
21st-century Belgian politicians
Members of the Senate (Belgium)
People from Antwerp Province